The 1989 Asian Men's Handball Championship was the fifth Asian Championship, which was taking place from 18 August to 1 September 1989 in Beijing, China.

Preliminary round

Group A

Group B

Elimination round

Final round

Placement 7th–9th

Placement 4th–6th

Championship

Final standing

References
Results

H
Asian Handball Championships
A
H
August 1989 sports events in Asia
September 1989 sports events in Asia